Cowessess 73A is an Indian reserve of the Cowessess First Nation in Saskatchewan. It is 31 kilometres west of Esterhazy.

References

Indian reserves in Saskatchewan
Division No. 5, Saskatchewan
Cowessess First Nation